Athenian school may refer to:

Schools
 Athenian School, a boarding prep school in Danville, California, United States
 Athenian Academy or Platonic Academy, the lyceum of Classical Athens

Other uses
 First Athenian School (1830–1880), a period of the literature of Greece 
 New Athenian School (1880s), a period in the literature of Greece

See also
 The School of Athens, a fresco by Raphael in the Apostolic Palace at the Vatican
 Academy of Athens (disambiguation)